Talra Wildlife Sanctuary is located in Shimla, Himachal Pradesh, India. It became a wildlife sanctuary in the year 1962. This wildlife sanctuary covers an area of 40 km2. It is an eco-sensitive zone, notified by the Ministry of Environment, Forest and Climate Change (MOEFCC). It is home to Snow Leopard which is very rare in the region.

Location 
Talra Wildlife Sanctuary has an ESZ ranging from 0.954 km to 4.00 km, and ‌22.56 km2. Located about a distance of 92 km away from Shimla district, the wildlife sanctuary has an elevation of 1,500 m to 3,324 m.

Wildlife 
Talra Wildlife Sanctuary is home to forest trees that are native to both the Upper and Lower Western Himalayas. The densely forested areas are covered by trees such as Oak and Fir. Other varieties of flora include Deodar, Bhoj Patra, Rai, and Rakhal.  Fauna such as leopards, Himalayan Black Bear, serow, Porcupine, Barking Deer, Himalayan Palm Civet, Eurasian SparrowHawk, Flying Squirrel, etc., are found here.

References 

Wildlife sanctuaries in Himachal Pradesh
Shimla
Protected areas established in 1962
1962 establishments in Himachal Pradesh